"The One Where No One Proposes" is the first episode of Friends ninth season. It first aired on the NBC network in the United States on September 26, 2002.

Plot
At the end of season eight, hours after giving birth to her and Ross's daughter Emma, Rachel accidentally thinks Joey proposed to her, and says yes. Throughout the episode, Joey tries to tell her the truth before Ross finds out but keeps getting interrupted. Meanwhile, Monica asks Rachel if she really wants to marry Joey. She admits that she does not want to marry him; she only said yes out of fear of raising Emma alone.

When Phoebe sees Rachel with the ring which actually belonged to Ross's grandmother, she thinks Ross proposed. She confronts Ross who denies proposing to Rachel, but later thinks he might have. He decides to meet Rachel to put an end to the confusion. Joey comes in and Ross and Joey then end up arguing and Rachel realises that no one actually proposed. Joey leaves and Ross tries to see if he can start things up again with Rachel. Then he sees that Rachel is wearing the ring and asks her if she said yes when she thought Joey proposed. Rachel does not know what to answer and the episode ends in a cliffhanger.

Monica and Chandler continue their attempts to make a baby of their own, and use a utility closet in the hospital, where they are caught by Monica's father, Jack. When he proceeds to show them sex moves that guarantee conception, the couple are visibly freaked out.

Reception
In the original broadcast, the episode was viewed by 25.5 million viewers. Sam Ashurst from Digital Spy ranked it #219 on their ranking of the 236 Friends episodes. Telegraph & Argus ranked it #210 on their ranking of all 236 Friends episodes.

References

2002 American television episodes
Friends (season 9) episodes